Benzvalene is an organic compound and one of several isomers of benzene. It was first synthesized in 1971 by Thomas J. Katz et al.

The 1971 synthesis consisted of treating cyclopentadiene with methyllithium in dimethyl ether and then with dichloromethane and methyllithium in diethyl ether at −45 °C.  It can also be formed in low yield (along with fulvene and Dewar benzene) by irradiation of benzene at 237 to 254 nm.  The hydrocarbon in solution was described as having an extremely foul odor. Due to the high steric strain present in benzvalene, the pure compound (~71 kcal/mol higher in energy than benzene) easily detonates, for example by scratching.

The compound converts to benzene with a chemical half-life of approximately 10 days. This symmetry-forbidden transition is believed to take place through a diradical intermediate.

Polybenzvalene
Benzvalene can be polymerized in a ROMP process to polybenzvalene. This polymer contains  highly strained bicyclobutane rings which again makes it a sensitive material. The rings can be isomerized to 1,3-dienes and for this reason polybenzvalene has been investigated as a precursor to polyacetylene.

References

External links

Explosive chemicals
Cycloalkenes
Tricyclic compounds
Cyclopentenes
Substances discovered in the 1970s